Jackson Township is one of nine townships in Wells County, Indiana, United States. As of the 2010 census, its population was 837 and it contained 336 housing units.

Geography

Unincorporated towns
 Dillman at 
 Jeff at 
 McNatts at 
 Mount Zion at 
(This list is based on USGS data and may include former settlements.)

Adjacent townships
 Salamonie Township, Huntington County (north)
 Liberty Township (northeast)
 Chester Township (east)
 Harrison Township, Blackford County (southeast)
 Washington Township, Blackford County (south)
 Monroe Township, Grant County (southwest)
 Van Buren Township, Grant County (west)
 Jefferson Township, Huntington County (northwest)

Cemeteries
The township contains these three cemeteries: Batson, Jones and Wright.

Rivers
 Salamonie River

Lakes
 Lost Lake

School districts
 Southern Wells Community Schools

Political districts
 Indiana's 3rd congressional district
 State House District 82
 State Senate District 19

References
 United States Census Bureau 2007 TIGER/Line Shapefiles
 United States Board on Geographic Names (GNIS)
 IndianaMap

External links
 Indiana Township Association
 United Township Association of Indiana

Townships in Wells County, Indiana
Fort Wayne, IN Metropolitan Statistical Area
Townships in Indiana